The Israeli passport (Darkon Yisre'eli) is a passport issued to Israeli citizens to enable them to travel outside Israel, and entitles the bearer to the protection of Israel's consular officials overseas. Israeli citizens have visa-free or visa on arrival access to 160 countries and territories.

Israeli citizens are allowed to hold passports of other countries, but, per a 2002 regulation, are required to use the Israeli passport when entering and leaving Israel.

History
Mandatory Palestine passports ceased to be valid at the end of the British Mandate of Palestine on 15 May 1948. Israel began issuing what was described as travel documents from that date, with an initial validity of two years and used Hebrew and French texts. After the Knesset (Israeli parliament) passed the Israeli nationality law in 1952, Israeli travel documents began to be described as passports. The first passport was issued to Golda Meir, who at the time worked for the Jewish Agency and was soon to become Israel's ambassador to the USSR.

The first Israeli travel documents bore the limitation: "Valid to any country except Germany." An Israeli who wished to visit Germany had to ask that the words "except Germany" be deleted from their passport. This was done manually by drawing a line through these words. After the signing of the Reparations Agreement between Israel and West Germany in 1952, the limitation was withdrawn and passports became "valid to all countries".

Israeli passports issued after 30 March 1980 have used Hebrew and English texts, instead of the previous Hebrew and French.

In 2006, an Israeli passport became an accepted form of identification in elections in Israel. Previously, only an internal identity card was accepted for this purpose. 

Denial or withdrawal of an Israeli passport is one of the sanctions an Israeli rabbinical court may use to enforce divorce upon a husband who chains his wife into marriage against her will.

Since 2013, biometric passports have been introduced, in line with standards used by the United States, European Union and other countries. To obtain a biometric passport, an applicant must appear in an Interior Ministry office "to be photographed by the special camera which records information such as facial bone structure, distance between one's eyes, ears to eyes and ratio of facial features one from another. One will also be fingerprinted and all this information will be contained in the new high-tech electronic passport." It was reported that the border control representatives tore non-biometric passports of Israeli citizens.

As of May 2022, the Ministry of Population starting reissuing non-biometric passports (valid for 2 years instead of 1) to tackle the enormous influx of Israelis applying for biometric passport, as it is rumored that a normal passport application take up to 6 weeks instead of 2. A new temporary office has been opened in Bnei Brak where Israelis can receive a temporary passport for NIS 400, which must be paid online as the office itself cannot receive payments. This provides a cheaper alternative to the office at Ben Gurion airport, which provides such passports for NIS 820. By the end of May, 5,000 people will have received such passports from the Bnei Brak office.

Description

Israeli passports are navy blue, with the Israeli emblem in the center of the front cover, below the words "" and "STATE OF ISRAEL" in Hebrew and English, respectively. The words "" and "PASSPORT" are inscribed below the emblem. The inner pages are decorated with the Israeli emblem of olive branches and the seven-branched menorah. The regular passport contains 32 pages, and the business passport contains 64 pages.

Israeli passports are valid for up to 10 years for persons over the age of 18. They are bilingual, using both Hebrew and English. Since Hebrew is written from right to left, the passports are opened from their right end and their pages are arranged from right to left. Arabic is not used in Israeli passports, even though it is used in internal identity cards and is classified as having a 'special status in the state' with its use by state institutions to be set in law.

Identity information page
Israeli passport information appears on page 2, and includes the following:

Photo of passport holder on the left
Type (P/) 
Code of State (ISR) 
Passport no. 
Israeli ID no. 
Surname 
Given name 
Nationality 
Date of birth 
Sex 
Place of birth 
Date of issue 
Date of expiry 
Authority (- I.C. Passport at) 
Signature of bearer (in biometric passport) 

All information appears both in Hebrew and English. The information page ends with the Machine Readable Zone. The signature of bearer follows on page 3 (in a non-biometric passport).

Passport note
The statement in an Israeli passport declares in Hebrew and English:
The Minister of the Interior of the State of Israel hereby requests all those whom it may concern to allow the bearer of this passport to pass freely without let or hindrance and to afford him such assistance and protection as may be necessary.

Back cover
The information on the inside back cover of an Israeli passport states in Hebrew only (English translation below):
This passport is the property of the State of Israel and is a valuable document which must be preserved carefully. Do not add or delete any information in the passport, tear out a page or pages from it, or destroy or corrupt the passport. The law states that the perpetrator of such action and who uses an illegal passport that is not his or lets anyone else use his passport illegally, has committed an offense and is liable to be punished.

An Israeli citizen who is also a foreign citizen and holds a foreign passport must enter and exit Israel with an Israeli passport or travel document.

In the case of loss or theft of the passport in Israel, the nearest Population Office must be immediately notified. If the passport is lost or stolen overseas, the nearest Israeli embassy or consulate must be notified.

Be careful not to lose your passport. When you use it, keep it secured inside the pocket of your clothes and not in your bag or car. When you travel abroad, it is recommended to bring a photocopy of the information page.

The passport is valid for all countries (unless otherwise noted) until the date listed on page 2. After expiration, or if your passport has worn thin or is filled, it must be replaced with a new one.

Attention!!! This passport contains sensitive electronic circuits. For optimal functioning of these circuits, please do not fold, puncture and/or expose your passport to high temperatures and/or excessive moisture.

Travel document 

Israel may issue a travel document ( teudat ma'avar) to a person who does not have an Israeli or foreign passport which allows the person to enter and leave the country. It may be issued in the following circumstances:
to a non-citizen residents / foreigners, who does not have another passport, for example a stateless person, or their citizenship not defined, to allow them to leave the country, for example in cases of foreigners who infiltrated to Israel and are deported, or foreigners who need to leave the country for any other reason and are unable to obtain a passport from another country.
to Israeli citizens in lieu of a passport, for example for those who lost their passports overseas.

Holders of a travel document are not entitled to the same visa-free entry to certain countries as holders of a standard Israeli passport, as the travel document is not accepted for travel or identification purposes by many countries. The use of a travel document to leave Israel does not, of itself, entitle the holder to enter another country nor to return to Israel.

Travel document for foreigners 
A travel document ( "Teudat Ma'avar Israelit Lezarim") may be issued to Arab residents of East-Jerusalem who have neither Israeli nor Jordanian citizenship, and to non-Israeli Arab residents of the Golan Heights.

Travel document in lieu of passport 
A Travel Document in Lieu of National Passport ( Teudat Ma'avar bimkom Darkon Leumi) may be issued to an Israeli citizen by the Ministry of Interior in a number of circumstances:

A new immigrant to Israel acquires Israeli nationality immediately when issued with a certificate of immigration (תעודת עולה teudat oleh) upon arrival in the country, but this nationality may be waived with retroactive effect to the moment the certificate of immigration was issued if such an application is filed with the ministry of the interior within 90 days following the issuance of the certificate of immigration. During these 90 days, a new immigrant cannot apply for an Israeli passport or travel document unless they file a waiver of the right to waive the automatic acquisition of Israeli nationality. Prior to 2017, a new immigrant could not be issued with an Israeli passport until they had resided in Israel for a period of at least 270 days following the issuance of their certificate of immigration. In 2017, this restriction was lifted when the passport act was modified by the Knesset.
Foreign or stateless residents, and refugees.
Israeli citizens with criminal record.
Israeli citizens who have lost or destroyed over three passports.
Israeli citizens who have lost their passport during an overseas trip.
Israeli citizens who are returning to Israel by decision of the Israeli government.

They are normally valid for two years, and not for more than five years. The issuance of travel documents instead of passports became prevalent in the 1990s as the Israeli government reacted to a wave of Russian organized crime gangs who immigrated to Israel and began using Israeli passports for their activities.

Visa requirements and limitations on passport use

Visa requirements

According to the 2018 Henley Passport Index, Israeli citizens had visa-free or visa on arrival access to 161 countries and territories, ranking the Israeli passport 21st in the world in terms of travel freedom (tied with the Barbadian and Emirati passports). Additionally, Arton Capital's Passport Index ranked the Israeli passport 16th in the world in terms of travel freedom, with a visa-free score of 146, as of 2 December 2018.

Limitations on use by Israel
Under the 1954 Israeli Prevention of Infiltration Law, Lebanon, Egypt, Syria, Saudi Arabia, Jordan, Iraq and Yemen were designated "enemy states". Israeli citizens may not visit countries so designated without a permit issued by the Israeli Interior Ministry. Egypt and Jordan were removed from the list following the signing of peace accords with these countries in 1978 and 1994, while Iran was added after the 1979 Iranian Revolution. In January 2020, Israel's Minister of the Interior announced that Israeli citizens, both Muslims and Jews, can travel to Saudi Arabia for religious and business purposes. These countries have their own bans on the entry of Israelis.

Countries that do not accept Israeli passports

Fourteen countries that do not recognize the state of Israel also do not admit Israeli passport holders:

 Except for Kurdistan Region, which has never been considered an enemy of Israel, the Kurdistan Region–Israel relations have been made public on many occasions. The two states have close and friendly relations, both economically and military.
 Unless a clearance permit is obtained from the Ministry of Home Affairs in addition to a visa prior to arrival.
Except for 2022 FIFA World Cup
 Except for religious and business purposes.

In addition, six of these countries — Iran, Kuwait, Lebanon, Libya, Syria and Yemen — do not allow entry to people with evidence of travel to Israel, or whose passports have either a used or an unused Israeli visa.

As a consequence, many countries may issue a second passport to citizens wishing to circumvent this restriction, and the Israeli immigration services have now mostly ceased stamping entry or exit stamps in all passports. Some Israelis will try to apply for dual citizenship in order to circumvent existing travel bans as an Israeli citizen.

Image gallery

See also
 Mandatory Palestine passport
 Visa policy of Israel
 Visa requirements for Israeli citizens
 Israeli identity card
 Israeli nationality law
 Who is a Jew?
 Law of Return

References

External links 
 

Foreign relations of Israel
Law enforcement in Israel
Passports by country